Peloton is the second album by the Delgados, released in 1998 on their own label, Chemikal Underground. The title refers to the large main group in a road bicycle race.

The album peaked at No. 56 on the UK Albums Chart.

Critical reception
AllMusic called it "an eclectic offering that travels beyond the sphere of pop."

Track listing
All songs by The Delgados.
 "Everything Goes Around the Water"
 "The Arcane Model"
 "The Actress"
 "Clarinet"
 "Pull The Wires from the Wall"
 "Repeat Failure"
 "And So the Talking Stopped"
 "Don't Stop"
 "Blackpool"
 "Russian Orthodox"
 "The Weaker Argument Defeats the Stronger"

Personnel
 Alun Woodward
 Emma Pollock
 Stewart Henderson
 Paul Savage
Featuring:
 Alan Barr, Jennifer Christie, Emily MacPherson - strings
 Camille Mason - flute, clarinet and piano
 Gregor Reid - percussion
 James Jarvie - black magic
 Adam Piggot - artwork design

References

The Delgados albums
1998 albums
Chemikal Underground albums